Sanjay Leela Bhansali (born 24 February 1963) is an Indian filmmaker, director, screenwriter, and music composer who is known for his work in Hindi cinema. He is the recipient of several awards, including four National Film Awards, ten Filmfare Awards and a BAFTA nomination. In 2015, the Government of India honoured him with the Padma Shri, the fourth highest civilian award.

Bhansali's directorial debut was the musical romance Khamoshi (1996), that earned him a Filmfare Award for Best Film (Critics). He then attained prominence in Hindi cinema with the successful love triangle Hum Dil De Chuke Sanam (1999). He then directed the period romantic drama Devdas (2002), which was nominated for Best Film Not in the English Language at BAFTA.  and the drama Black (2005) became one of the most critically acclaimed Hindi films, winning him multiple Best Film Awards and Best Director Awards along with additional Best Film (Critics) at Filmfare Awards. He also won multiple National Film Awards for Devdas and Black. However, a brief period of decline followed, with Saawariya (2007) and Guzaarish (2010), though the latter, his debut as a music composer, earned favourable reviews.

Bhansali reinforced his status with direction by adaptating Shakespeare's Romeo and Juliet into film with Goliyon Ki Raasleela Ram-Leela (2013), that opened to positive reviews and strong box office collections. His home production, the sports film Mary Kom (2014), earned him a third National Film Award. He built his establishment more by directing the big-scale period dramas Bajirao Mastani (2015) and Padmaavat (2018), both of which rank among the highest-grossing Indian films of all time. For Bajirao Mastani, Bhansali was feliciated with National Film Award for Best Direction, as well as Filmfare Awards for Best Film and Best Director; and for Padmaavat, he won a National Film Award for Best Music Direction and Filmfare Award for Best Music Director. His next, the crime drama Gangubai Kathiawadi (2022), unlike his other films was focused on a female protagonist. The film became a commercial success and garnered high critical acclaim. 

As a producer, he backs films under his banner Bhansali Productions.

Early life 
Sanjay Leela Bhansali was born on 24 February 1963 in Bhuleshwar, South Bombay into a Gujarati Jain family. His mother, Leela, used to sew clothes to make ends meet. He speaks Gujarati at home and loves Gujarati food, music, literature and architecture.

His sister, Bela Bhansali Sehgal, has directed Shirin Farhad Ki Toh Nikal Padi, for which he wrote the script, while Bela's daughter, Sharmin Segal, made her debut as an actress under his production Malaal, for which he also served as fellow writer and composer.

Career

Early work (1989–2002) 
Bhansali began his career as an assistant to Vidhu Vinod Chopra and was involved in the making of Parinda (1989), 1942: A Love Story (1994) and Kareeb (1998). However, they had a falling-out when Bhansali refused to direct Kareeb. In 1996, he made his directorial debut with Khamoshi: The Musical, the commercially unsuccessful but critically acclaimed film about a daughter's struggle to communicate with her deaf-mute parents. The film earned the Best Film (Critics) at Filmfare.

He rose to prominence in Indian cinema with a triangular love story, Hum Dil De Chuke Sanam (1999), starring Aishwarya Rai, Salman Khan, and Ajay Devgan, which established his individualistic stamp for visual splendour and creating auras of celebration and festivity. The film was premiered in the Indian Panorama section at the 1999 International Film Festival of India. It was a critical and commercial success, and won numerous awards including 4 National Awards and 9 Filmfare Awards.

Devdas and career influctuations  (2002–2012) 
His next film Devdas (2002), starring Shah Rukh Khan, Aishwarya Rai and Madhuri Dixit, was Bhansali's ode to the novel of the same name, which became the highest-grossing film of the year. The film also earned widespread critical acclaim and won 10 awards at Filmfare, emerging as the most-awarded film in Filmfare, (tying with Dilwale Dulhania Le Jayenge (1995)). At the 50th National Film Awards, it won 5 awards including Best Popular Film Providing Wholesome Entertainment. It received a nomination for the Best Foreign Film at the British Academy of Film & Television Awards (BAFTA). It was India's submission for the Academy Award for Best Foreign Language Film. The film was also screened at the 2002 Cannes Film Festival. It stood eighth in Time magazine's "The 10 Greatest Movies of the Millennium (Thus Far)". 

His next film, Black, starring Rani Mukerji and Amitabh Bachchan, broke his own all-time record of Devdas by garnering 11 awards, the highest number of awards ever given to a single film at Filmfare. It stood fifth in Time (Europe)'s "10 Best Movies of the Year 2005" among films from across the world. At the 53rd National Film Awards, he received his second National Award for Best Feature Film in Hindi. Hum Dil De Chuke Sanam, Devdas and Black earned him multiple Best Director and Best Film awards at Filmfare, the latter also received additional Critics Award for Best Film. In 2006, Bhansali participated as a judge on reality TV show Jhalak Dikhhla Jaa alongside Farah Khan and Shilpa Shetty.

Bhansali's next film Saawariya (2007) was met with sharp criticism and poor collections at the box office. In 2008, Bhansali staged the opera Padmavati, an adaption of the 1923 ballet written by Albert Roussel. The show premiered in Paris at the prestigious Théâtre du Châtelet and next at the Festival dei Due Mondi, where it received "fifteen minutes of standing ovation and seven curtain calls at the end of the first show." Bhansali received highly positive reviews from international critics for his work. In 2010, Bhansali released Guzaarish, starring Hrithik Roshan and Aishwarya Rai, in which he also made his debut in music direction. The film received mixed reviews from critics, but could not perform well at the box office. Guzaarish earned him a Best Director nomination at Filmfare. In 2011, he became a judge on the Indian music talent show X Factor India Season 1. The same year, he also produced the musical comedy My Friend Pinto, which received negative reviews and tanked at the box office. In 2012, Bhansali produced Rowdy Rathore, a remake of the Telugu film Vikramarkudu, starring Akshay Kumar and Sonakshi Sinha and directed by Prabhu Deva. The film received mixed reviews from critics and became a major commercial success, with Box Office India labelling it as a blockbuster. The following year, he produced Shirin Farhad Ki Toh Nikal Padi, which also received mixed reviews, but could not perform well at the box office.

Widespread success (2013–present) 

In 2013, Bhansali directed Goliyon Ki Raasleela Ram-Leela, an adaptation of Shakespeare's Romeo and Juliet, starring Deepika Padukone and Ranveer Singh. Some religious groups opposed the film claiming that the former title Ramleela was misleading, because the movie had nothing to do with Ramlila, the traditional enactment of the life and story of Hindu deity, Lord Rama. The film's release had been stayed by Delhi High Court due to the controversy over its title, claiming that the movie hurt the religious sentiments of Hindus. Later the film's title was changed to Goliyon Ki Raasleela Ram-Leela, and eventually released in India as scheduled. However, after a week of release, Lucknow bench of Allahabad High Court banned the movie's release in Uttar Pradesh.  Despite the controversy and limited release, the film opened to critical acclaim and strong box office collections worldwide, ultimately earning ₹2.02 billion (US$31 million) and emerging as the fifth highest-grossing film of 2013. The film garnered several award nominations for Bhansali including Best Film and Best Director nominations at Filmfare. The same year, Bhansali debuted in television with the show Saraswatichandra, starring Gautam Rode and Jennifer Winget, which he later left after few episodes.

The following year, he produced the biographical sports film Mary Kom starring Priyanka Chopra, which premiered at the 2014 Toronto International Film Festival, becoming the first Hindi film to be screened on the opening night of the festival. The film became both a critical and commercial success and received various accolades including a nomination for the Filmfare Award for Best Film. At the 62nd National Film Awards, Bhansali received another National Award for Best Popular Film Providing Wholesome Entertainment for the film. In 2015, he produced the action drama Gabbar Is Back starring Akshay Kumar, which also emerged as a commercial success and received positive reviews from critics.

Bhansali's next directorial venture was his dream project, the period romantic drama Bajirao Mastani (2015), based on the love story between Peshwa Baji Rao I and his second wife Mastani. Ranveer Singh and Deepika Padukone played the title roles, while Priyanka Chopra played Bajirao's first wife, Kashibai. The film was announced in 2003 and was constantly in the news regarding the cast, including actors such as Salman Khan, Shah Rukh Khan, Aishwarya Rai Bachchan, Kareena Kapoor and Rani Mukerji. The descendants of Bajirao I and Mastani expressed their disapproval of this film, claiming excessive creative liberty by Bhansali causing wrongful portrayal of their ancestors. A petition was filed in Bombay High Court seeking a stay on the film, but the High Court refused to interfere with its release. It received high critical acclaim worldwide and was listed among the best films of 2015 by several sources. Despite the controversy, the film emerged as one of the highest-grossing Indian films of all time. The film received many accolades at various award ceremonies in India. At the 63rd National Film Awards, Bajirao Mastani won 7 awards and Bhansali won the National Award for Best Director, in addition to winning Best Film and Best Director at Filmfare. The film was featured at the 2016 Indian Panorama section of the International Film Festival of India. Bajirao Mastani was selected as India's official entry for the Best Foreign Language Film for the 74th Golden Globe Awards. The following year, he produced the Marathi film Laal Ishq.

Bhansali directed the period drama film Padmaavat (2018), jointly produced by him and Viacom 18 Motion Pictures, and also written by him. The film stars Deepika Padukone in the title role as Rani Padmini, alongside Shahid Kapoor and Ranveer Singh in the title roles of Rawal Ratan Singh and Alauddin Khalji respectively. During the shooting of the film in January 2017 in Jaipur, the members of Shri Rajput Karni Sena protested at the sets at Jaigarh Fort, physically attacked Bhansali and his crew members, alleging that he misrepresented historical facts and depicted them erroneously in the film, and also tried to vandalise the sets. On 6 March 2017, members of Shri Rajput Karni Sena vandalised the Chittor Fort again and broke the mirrors installed in the palace of Rani Padmini. On 15 March 2017, a group of unidentified vandals again attacked and set fire to the sets of this movie in Kolhapur which led to the production set, costumes and jewelleries being burnt. The film earned 30 million dollars in the first four days after its release. Padmaavat emerged as the highest-grossing film on the year, and received highly positive reviews from critics, and earned Bhansali the National Film Award for Best Music Direction and the Filmfare Award for Best Music Director, in addition to Best Film and Best Director nominations at Filmfare.

In 2021, Bhansali directed Gangubai Kathiawadi, a biographical crime film based on a chapter of Hussain Zaidi's book Mafia Queens of Mumbai. The film about Gangubai Kothewali, stars Alia Bhatt as Gangubai, and was scheduled for release on 30 July 2021, but was postponed due to the COVID-19 pandemic.

Filmography

Films

Television 
 Jhalak Dikhhla Jaa 1 (Judge) – 2006
 X Factor India (Judge) – 2011
 Saraswatichandra (Producer) – 2013 - 2014

Stage 
 Stage Opera Padmavati (Director) – 2008

Web series 
 Heeramandi (Director) – upcoming

Awards and nominations

References

External links 

 

Living people
Film directors from Mumbai
Hindi-language film directors
Best Director National Film Award winners
Filmfare Awards winners
Screen Awards winners
International Indian Film Academy Awards winners
Zee Cine Awards winners
Film and Television Institute of India alumni
Hindi film score composers
Indian male screenwriters
Hindi film producers
Recipients of the Padma Shri in arts
1963 births
Film producers from Mumbai
20th-century Indian film directors
21st-century Indian film directors
Gujarati people
Producers who won the Best Popular Film Providing Wholesome Entertainment National Film Award
Directors who won the Best Popular Film Providing Wholesome Entertainment National Film Award
21st-century Indian Jains